Home Defense is a 1943 animated short film produced by Walt Disney Productions and distributed by RKO Radio Pictures. The film shows Donald Duck and his three nephews Huey, Dewey, and Louie serving as civilian aircraft spotters during World War II. The film was directed by Jack King; Clarence Nash voices the characters.

Plot
The story takes place during World War II in which Donald Duck and his nephews, Huey, Dewey, & Louie, are serving as civilian aircraft spotters on the West Coast of the United States. In order to detect the sound of approaching enemy aircraft, Donald uses a listening apparatus consisting of headphones and a large horn amplifier pointed skyward.

One morning at the listening post, Donald accidentally wakes up Huey, Dewey, and Louie who were sleeping nearby. The boys, serving as Donald's gun crew, retaliate by faking an airborne invasion as a prank. They fill a motorized toy plane with gingerbread paratroopers and fly it around the amplifier. Donald awakes, sees the plane, and shoots it down with his home-made anti-aircraft battery. As the plane is falling to earth, the gingerbread men deploy. When Donald sees the parachutes, he panics and hides in the grass while Huey, Dewey, and Louie create artificial combat noises. When Donald finally discovers the ruse, he angrily calls his nephews to attention and relieves them of duty. The nephews tearfully leave as Donald continues to listen for aircraft alone.

Later, Donald hears the sound of a bee buzzing near the amplifier and believes that his nephews are playing a trick on him again. However, when he sees the boys are not up to anything, Donald returns to the listening post and continues to hear the bee, imagining the sound is approaching Japanese forces. Donald quickly reinstates the boys and has them man a large cannon. Donald carefully calculates the position of the sound and relays orders to Huey, Dewey, and Louie in aiming the cannon. After following Donald's instructions, the nephews aim the cannon directly at the acoustic horn where the bee is. Despite their objections, Donald orders them to fire the weapon, which sends the amplified blast into Donald's ears. The nephews laugh while Donald goes into his characteristic temper tantrum while suspended off the ground by his earphones.

Voice cast
 Donald Duck: Clarence Nash
 Huey, Dewey and Louie: Clarence Nash

Releases
1943 Theatrical release
1957 The Mickey Mouse Club (TV)
1997 Ink & Paint Club: "The Unseen Disney" (TV)
1998 Ink & Paint Club: "Triple Trouple" (TV)

Home media
The short was released on May 18, 2004 on Walt Disney Treasures: Walt Disney on the Front Lines and on December 6, 2005 on Walt Disney Treasures: The Chronological Donald, Volume Two: 1942-1946.

Additional releases include:
1985 An Officer and a Duck (VHS and Laserdisc)

References

External links

Home Defense at the Big Cartoon DataBase
Home Defense at the Encyclopedia of Disney Animated Shorts
Home Defense at the Disney Film Project

1943 films
1943 animated films
1943 short films
Donald Duck short films
1940s Disney animated short films
Films directed by Ben Hardaway
Films produced by Walt Disney
World War II films made in wartime
Pacific War films
Films set on the home front during World War II
Films scored by Oliver Wallace
Films with screenplays by Carl Barks